Keezha Manakudy is one of the villages of Kanyakumari district, Tamil Nadu, India.

Kanyakumari district